The 2017 Maldivian FA Charity Shield, (commonly known as the 2017 Milo Charity Shield due to sponsorship reasons) was the 9th Maldivian FA Charity Shield, an annual Maldivian football match played between the winners of the previous season's Dhivehi Premier League and FA Cup. The game was played between Maziya, champions of the 2016 Dhivehi Premier League, and Valencia, champions of 2016 Maldives FA Cup.

This was the fifth appearance of in the Maldivian FA Charity Shield Maziya, and second appearance for Valencia. Valencia won its first edition in the year 2009, defeating VB Sports Club. Maziya made their first appearance in 2013 and has been making back to back appearances since then, winning twice; in 2015 and 2016 defeating New Radiant on both occasions.

Match

Details

{| style="width:100%; font-size:90%;"
|
Man of the match
 Mohamed Umair (Maziya)

|style="width:60%; vertical-align:top;"|
'Match rules
90 minutes.
Penalty shoot-out if scores still level.
Maximum of three substitutions.
|}

See also
2016 Dhivehi Premier League
2016 Maldives FA Cup
Pre match talks by Maziya In Dhivehi - Mihaaru SportsPre match talks by Valencia In Dhivehi - Mihaaru SportsPost match talks by Maziya In Dhivehi - Mihaaru SportsPost match talks by Valencia In Dhivehi - Mihaaru SportsPhoto Gallery Sun Online''

References

Maldivian FA Charity Shield
Char